The Vickers Model 1931 was a British anti-aircraft gun used during the Second World War. The design was rejected by the British and Vickers exported the gun worldwide during the 1930s.

Operational history 
Romania bought a license for 100 in 1936, although hundreds more were built during the war. The second batch of 100 pieces was started in July 1941, the production rate being of 5 pieces per month as of October 1942. Denmark also bought a license. Belgium, the Netherlands, Lithuania, Turkey, Switzerland and China bought numbers of guns directly from Vickers. Finland bought a dozen to help reduce balance of payment problems with the British in 1936. The Finnish guns were chambered in their standard  caliber. 

Those weapons captured after the German conquest of Europe were taken into Wehrmacht service as the 7.5 cm Flak M 35(h) or 7.5 cm Flak M 35(d). Similarly the Soviet Union used those guns it captured from Lithuania. Supposedly it saw limited British service with Home Defense "barrage units" 1940—43.

The cruciform carriage had two pneumatic or solid rubber wheels that were removable. Two legs locked together for transport and the barrel was secured to them. The other two legs folded in half and were elevated almost vertically into the air (see the Romanian reference to see exactly how it looked).

Users

See also

75 mm Reșița Model 1943 — AT gun using major elements of the: 75 mm Vickers/Reșița Model 1936 (Vickers Model 31)

Notes

References

External links
 the Vickers in Finnish service
 the Vickers in Romanian service

Anti-aircraft guns of the United Kingdom
World War II anti-aircraft guns
World War II artillery of the United Kingdom
75 mm artillery
Vickers
Military equipment introduced in the 1930s